Carp and Pine is an Edo period Japanese woodblock print. Created on commission for a club in Kamige by Yashima Gakutei, the work depicts a dark-scaled carp resting in muddy water. The work, which is in the collection of the Metropolitan Museum of Art, was described by the museum as "the quintessential fish surimono."

References 

Collection of the Metropolitan Museum of Art